Floyd Marion McDowell (26 March 1889 – 27 October 1964) was an American leader in the Reorganized Church of Jesus Christ of Latter Day Saints (RLDS Church). McDowell was a member of the church's First Presidency from 1922 to 1938.

McDowell was born in Excelsior, Wisconsin. He attended Graceland College from 1907 to 1909, and he later received degrees from Iowa State University (BA, 1911), Clark University (MA, 1914), and University of Iowa (Ph.D., 1918). He lived most of his life in Lamoni, Iowa, where the RLDS Church headquarters were located.

On 2 October 1922, McDowell was selected as a counselor to RLDS Church president Frederick M. Smith in the church's First Presidency. In April 1938, McDowell's fellow counselor Elbert A. Smith was released; later that year, McDowell resigned as a member of the First Presidency. Frederick Smith selected Israel A. Smith and Lemuel F. P. Curry to succeed Elbert Smith and McDowell.

After his resignation, McDowell became the RLDS Church's Director of Priesthood Education, a position he held until 1954, when he became a patriarch in the church. From 1922 to 1952, McDowell was also a member of the Board of Trustees of Graceland College.

References

Sources
Roy Cheville (1970). They Made a Difference (Independence, Mo.: Herald House) pp. 327–338
History of the Reorganized Church of Jesus Christ of Latter Day Saints 7:709–711
"Obituary: Floyd M. McDowell", Saints' Herald, vol. 111, no. 23, pp. 822–823 (1964)

1889 births
1964 deaths
American leaders of the Community of Christ
Clark University alumni
Graceland University alumni
Members of the First Presidency (Community of Christ)
People from Lamoni, Iowa
People from Richland County, Wisconsin
University of Iowa alumni
Iowa State University alumni
Doctrine and Covenants people